Romont may refer to:
Romont, Vosges, France
Romont, Fribourg, Switzerland
Romont Castle
Romont, Berne, Switzerland
Romont, West Virginia, United States